Anthoceras is a genus of straight, annulated, proterocamerioceratids (Order Endocerida) from the Lower Ordovician, found in North America, NW Australia, and Siberia. The cross section is circular, the siphuncle moderately large, and marginal. Segments are constricted (producing concave profiles in internal molds); septal necks hemichoantici to subholochoantic (reaching halfway to almost to the previous septum); connecting rings thick. Endocones are long and slightly asymmetric.

This genus is based on the phragmocone, the chambered part of the shell;  the apical and apertural ends are unknown.

See also

References 

 Curt Teichert, 1964.  Endoceratoidea. Treatise on Invertebrate Paleontology, Part K. Geol Soc. of America and Univ of Kansas press. Teichert and Moore (eds)
 

Prehistoric nautiloid genera